The canton of Château-Chinon (before 2015: Canton of Château-Chinon (Ville)) is an administrative division of the Nièvre department, central France. Its borders were modified at the French canton reorganisation which came into effect in March 2015. Its seat is in Château-Chinon (Ville).

It consists of the following communes:
 
Achun
Alligny-en-Morvan
Alluy
Arleuf
Aunay-en-Bazois
Biches
Blismes
Brinay
Château-Chinon (Campagne)
Château-Chinon (Ville)
Châtillon-en-Bazois
Châtin
Chaumard
Chougny
Corancy
Dommartin
Dun-sur-Grandry
Fâchin
Gien-sur-Cure
Glux-en-Glenne
Gouloux
Lavault-de-Frétoy
Limanton
Mont-et-Marré
Montapas
Montigny-en-Morvan
Montreuillon
Montsauche-les-Settons
Moux-en-Morvan
Onlay
Ougny
Ouroux-en-Morvan
Planchez
Saint-Agnan
Saint-Brisson
Saint-Hilaire-en-Morvan
Saint-Léger-de-Fougeret
Saint-Péreuse
Tamnay-en-Bazois
Tintury

References

Cantons of Nièvre